Barry M. Meyer (born November 28, 1946) is an American television producer who served as Chairman of Warner Bros. Entertainment.

Early life
Born to a Jewish family in New York City, the son of Perry Meyer and Lillian Katz Meyer. Meyer holds a bachelor’s degree from the University of Rochester and a Juris Doctor from Case Western Reserve University School of Law. He is a member of the bar in New York and was admitted to the practice of law in Ohio in 1967, however his Ohio license was suspended in 2005.

Warner Bros.
Meyer joined the Warner Bros. Entertainment in 1971 as Director, Business Affairs for Warner Bros. Television, following two and a half years in both the legal and business affairs departments of the ABC Television Network. In 1972, Meyer was named Vice President, Business Affairs, Warner Bros. Television. In 1978, he became Executive Vice President for the television division and in 1984, he was promoted to Executive Vice President of Warner Bros. Inc., taking charge of all of the Studio’s television operations.

In 1994, Meyer took on added responsibilities as Chief Operating Officer, which included oversight of the Company’s general operations (including studio facilities, legal and business affairs, general administration, human resources, labor relations, strategic planning, real estate development and government affairs), as well as all of the Studio’s television production and distribution operations (including Warner Bros. Television, Telepictures Productions, Warner Bros. Animation and the domestic and international television distribution divisions). Meyer was also an integral architect in the formation of The WB Television Network, which went on the air in January 1995 and played a similar role in the founding of The CW.

Barry M. Meyer became Chairman & Chief Executive Officer of Warner Bros. on October 4, 1999 after having served as the Studio’s Executive Vice President & Chief Operating Officer since April 1994.

Under Meyer’s leadership, Warner Bros. consistently ranked as one of the most profitable studios in the industry. In 2009, Warner Bros. Pictures' domestic division had its most successful year ever, and both the domestic and international division had their ninth consecutive billion dollar-plus years at the box office.  In March 2013, Meyer stepped down as CEO of Warner Bros. and was succeeded by Kevin Tsujihara.

Other Activities 
Meyer often serves as a key advisor on industry-wide production, labor and regulatory issues. He is a member of the Board of Councilors of the USC School of Cinema-Television; a member of the Board of Directors of the Motion Picture Association of America; a member of the Board of the Museum of Television & Radio; a member of the Academy of Motion Picture Arts & Sciences; a member and former Governor of the Academy of Television Arts & Sciences; a member and past member of the Board of the Hollywood Radio and Television Society; and is involved in numerous charitable and civic activities.  Meyer was honored with the American Jewish Committee’s 2006 Dorothy and Sherrill C. Corwin Human Relations Award for his many humanitarian efforts. Meyer has been on the Activision Blizzard board of directors since January 2014.

References 

Living people
20th-century American Jews
The CW executives
Warner Bros. people
1946 births
21st-century American Jews